There are 55 listed buildings (Swedish: byggnadsminne) in Södermanland County.

Eskilstuna Municipality

Flen Municipality

Gnesta Municipality

Katrineholm Municipality

Nyköping Municipality

Oxelösund Municipality

Strängnäs Municipality

Trosa Municipality

External links

  Bebyggelseregistret

Listed buildings in Sweden